The Certified Treasury Professional (CTP) is a certification awarded by the Association for Financial Professionals (AFP) of Bethesda, Maryland to individuals who meet eligibility criteria and demonstrate current competency standards measured through the CTP examination. More than 30,000 individuals have earned the credential.

Background
Once a CTP, certificants must abide by the CTP Standards of ethical conduct and must enhance their level of knowledge and skills by earning and reporting a prescribed number of continuing finance and business education credits every three years. The credential can be revoked by the Certification Committee of AFP for unethical behavior or by failure to earn and report continuing education credits.  Typically, the CTP Exam changes every three years when a new Essentials of Treasury Management text is issued.

Before 1986, the AFP awarded the Certified Cash Manager (CCM) and beginning in 2003 the CCM certification was phased into the current CTP to reflect the expanding role of treasury within corporate finance.

See also
Association of Corporate Treasurers
Professional certification
Professional certification in financial services
List of professional designations in the United States

References

External links
Association for Financial Professionals: afponline.org
Certified Treasury Professional: ctpcert.afponline.org 

Professional certification in finance
Corporate finance